The longhorn cowfish (Lactoria cornuta), also called the horned boxfish, is a species of boxfish from the family Ostraciidae, recognizable by its long horns that protrude from the front of its head, rather like those of a cow or bull.

They are omnivorous, feeding upon benthic algae, various microorganisms, and foraminiferans that it strains from sediments, sponges, polychaete worms from sand flats, mollusks, small crustaceans, and small fish, able to feed on benthic invertebrates by blowing jets of water into the sandy substrate. Longhorn cowfish protect the coral reefs they live in by being predators of the invertebrates that destroy the reefs. They are also important in the growth and creation of coral reefs for this same reason. According to the IUCN, the Longhorn cowfish is categorized as “Not Evaluated”. While this may eventually be impacted by aquarium trade, currently there is no concern now.

Habitat
Its primary habitat is coral reefs in lagoons, on reef flats, estuaries, bays, and on protected seaward reefs. Juveniles associate with Acropora corals. Depth range is 3.3–148 ft (1–45 m, perhaps up to 100 m).

Range
Red Sea and East Africa eastward through Indonesia to Marquesas, northward to southern Japan. Including Tuamotus, southern Korea, north to the Ryukyu Islands of southern Japan, south to Australia and Lord Howe Island, and off southern Africa in the Atlantic. Tropical and subtropical waters. The specimens found in India are a new development in the last couple years, and it is speculated that cyclones or typhoons brought the Lactoria cornuta to a new environment.

Physiology
There is no known sexual dimorphism, so both male and female display a yellow to olive base color, which is decorated with white or bluish spots. Paired courtship just before or after sunset. Eggs and ichthyoplankton are pelagic. Females generally are larger than males. Males grow to be 65-155 mm with an average of 103 mm, while females grow to be 83-250 mm with an average of 121 mm. Female Longhorn Cowfish also weigh more than males with a weight range of 17-156 g with an average of 33 g while males have a weight range of 12-116 g with an average of 26 g.

One distinction from other fish is the lack of a gill cover, which is replaced by a small slit or hole.
The hexagonal plate-like scales of these fish are fused together into a solid, triangular, box-like carapace, from which the fins and tail protrude. They have large eyes immediately behind the horns. Their unique method of swimming, called ostraciiform swimming, causes them to look as if they are hovering.
They have no pelvic skeleton, so they lack pelvic fins.
The tail fin of the Longhorn cowfish can be the same length as its body, as it relies on its fins for movement. They are such slow swimmers cowfish are easily caught by hand, making a grunting noise when captured.
The cowfish are also able to produce two kinds of sounds using muscles connected to their swim bladder, hums and clicks. This species of cowfish is the most well-known cowfish species in the aquarium trade.

Defense
If severely stressed, this species may be able to exude deadly toxin, pahutoxin, an ichthyotoxic, hemolytic, heat-stable, non-dialyzable, non-protein poison in the mucous secretions of their skin. It is apparently unique among known fish poisons; it is toxic to the boxfish and mimics sea cucumber toxins in general properties.

The horns of the Longhorn cowfish may have evolved to make it more difficult to swallow for predators.  The horns of the boxfish can be used to ward off predators through charging at the predator. If damaged, these horns can grow back within a few months. These horns are mostly hollow and composed of mineralized collagen fibers. Both the hard armor exoskeleton and the use of the toxic secretion are solid defenses against predators. There are also egg predators like labrids and pomacentridae. Larger species in the family are able to ward off the egg predators, but the Longhorn Cowfish spawn close to the substrate in order to hide themselves and their eggs from the predators.

Reproduction and Development 
This fish forms harems with 3-4 females in each one. The females spawn shortly after sunset, or during the day when there is a large amount of cloud cover. The spawning season lasts from February to early October. The oval eggs of members of the Lactoria family hatch into the juvenile larvae. These larvae are distinct because they form the box carapace armor that is present on the longhorn cowfish.

On Pamban Island, the local belief was that when the land got separated, the cows on the island metamorphosed into these fish and fed on seaweed.

References

External links
 

 
 

Ostraciidae
Fish described in 1758
Taxa named by Carl Linnaeus